Ricardo's squeaker (Synodontis ricardoae) is a species of upside-down catfish endemic to Tanzania.  This species grows to a length of  TL.

References

External links 

Ricardo's squeaker
Endemic freshwater fish of Tanzania
Ricardo's squeaker
Ricardo's squeaker
Taxonomy articles created by Polbot